The 2018 FIBA U16 European Championship Division B was the 15th edition of the Division B of the FIBA U16 European Championship. It was played in Sarajevo, Bosnia and Herzegovina, from 9 to 18 August 2018. 24 teams participated in the competition. Russia men's national under-16 basketball team won the tournament.

Participating teams 

  (15th place, 2017 FIBA U16 European Championship Division A)

  (16th place, 2017 FIBA U16 European Championship Division A)

  (14th place, 2017 FIBA U16 European Championship Division A)

First round

Group A

Group B

Group C

Group D

Playoffs

17th–24th place playoffs

9th–16th place playoffs

Championship playoffs

Final standings

References

External links
FIBA official website

FIBA U16 European Championship Division B
2018–19 in European basketball
2018–19 in Bosnia and Herzegovina basketball
International youth basketball competitions hosted by Bosnia and Herzegovina
Sports competitions in Sarajevo
August 2018 sports events in Europe